Logan is an electoral district in southern Queensland, Australia.

Logan encompasses urban and semi-rural environments on the southern outskirts of the Brisbane metropolitan area. Major locations within the electoral district include Boronia Heights, Greenbank, Munruben, Chambers Flat, Yarrabilba, Park Ridge, Jimboomba, Kairabah, South Maclean, and North Maclean.

History 

The electoral district of Logan was established under the 1872 Electoral Districts Act which excised the southern part of the Electoral district of East Moreton (the Gold Coast area). Successive redistributions shifted the boundaries northwards towards Brisbane. It was abolished in the 1949 redistribution, being mostly absorbed into the Electoral district of Coorparoo and the Electoral district of Yeronga.

In the 1959 redistribution, the Logan electoral district was re-created in the Redland Shire, largely replacing the Electoral district of Darlington. Logan electoral district was abolished again in the 1971 redistribution, by replaced by the Electoral district of Redlands.

In 1986 the Logan electoral district was again re-created, encompassing the north-eastern part of the Electoral district of Fassifern and the north-western part of the Electoral district of Albert. In 1991 the eastern half of the Logan electorate was lost to the Electoral district of Waterford and the Electoral district of Woodridge, leaving the Logan electorate located in the suburbs of Boronia Heights, Browns Plains, Marsden and Park Ridge.

Members for Logan

Election results

References

External links
 

Logan